Slime flux, also known as bacterial slime or bacterial wetwood, is a bacterial disease of certain trees, primarily elm, cottonwood, poplar, boxelder, ash, aspen, fruitless mulberry and oak. A wound to the bark, caused by pruning, insects, poor branch angles or natural cracks and splits, causes sap to ooze from the wound. Bacteria may infect this sap causing it to darken and stain the bark, eventually taking on a foamy appearance and unpleasant odor. This slimy ooze becomes toxic to the bark and eats into the tree. Additionally, the fermented sap attracts insects like flies, ants, and maggots.

Cause 
Slime flux occurs when a wound is made in a tree trunk through things such as natural growth cracks, frost, insects, birds, lawn mowers, cat scratches, or pruning wounds, which causal bacteria can enter. This accumulation of liquid and gas causes that part of the tree to have a damp, dark brown appearance known as wetwood. Eventually, the pressure will cause the sap and gasses to burst through the xylem and out of cracks in the trunk and ooze down the side of the tree. This sap flux may be further infected by other pathogens once exposed to the air such as air-borne bacteria, yeast, and fungi, at which point it is known as slime flux.

Causal agents 
Causal bacteria for the initial wetwood varies depending on the species of tree. The bacteria are commonly found in water and soils. Enterobacter cloacae is a causal bacteria of wetwood in American Elms. Xanthomonas spp., Argobacterium spp., Acinetobacter spp., Corynebacterium spp., Bacteroides spp., Clostridium spp., Edwardsiella spp., Klebsiella spp., Lactobacillus spp., Methanobacterium spp., Brevundimonas bullata, Paracoccus spp. and Luteimonas aestuarri have also been isolated from wetwood in various tree species.

Species of Prototheca have been isolated from slime fluxes.

Treatment 
There is no cure, but the bark of a tree is like skin. The wound should be disinfected with rubbing alcohol or a household bleach solution of one part bleach to nine parts water. The excess sap should be wiped from the tree to discourage hungry insects. With prompt and continuous treatment, the tree should survive. In the forest, practices that minimize wounding will reduce the spread of this disease. For urban trees, maintaining vigorous, healthy growing conditions (thorough watering, mulching around the base and adding compost to the drip line) and avoiding wounds will reduce the probability that trees will be affected by this disease. Removing bark from the affected area will reduce damage to an individual tree. Additionally, the “hungry insects” are most likely harmless. The main “pest” you will need to be concerned with are borers.

Background 
Slime flux or more commonly known as Wet wood is a seepage of the wood that is unseen by the human eye. The seepage is typically a sour smell that comes from the trunk of the tree.

Significance 
The slime flux disease causes a constant odor, and bleeding cankers on the base of the tree. Slime flux can eventually kill a tree. The bacteria and pathogens can spread to surrounding trees. Oozing liquid is a sign that there has been an earlier injury. In some cases, as the outer wound calluses over and the internal methane production decreases, the slime flux may stop in a year or two. In other cases slime flux may reoccur year after year.

Plants which may be affected

References 

 
 slime flux on www.forestpests.org
 

Bacterial tree pathogens and diseases